The Blake River Megacaldera Complex is a giant subaqueous caldera cluster or a nested caldera system that spans across the Ontario–Quebec border in Canada.

The caldera complex is around 2.7 billion years old, consisting of a series of overlapping calderas of various ages and sizes.

The Blake River Megacaldera Complex has been a centre of major interest since 2006 with numerous excursions at the international, national and local level. It is a world-class metallotect with respect to both hydrothermal Cu-Zn massive sulfides and gold-rich massive sulfides.

Structure and geographical extent 
The Blake River Megacaldera Complex consists of mainly mafic to intermediate volcanic flows and less abundant felsic volcanic flows and intercalated pyroclastic rocks, which underwent three stages of major volcanic activity.

It is a coalescence of at least two large mafic shield volcanoes that formed more than 2703 million years ago.
Its formation consists of thick massive mafic sequences which has inferred to be a subaqueous lava lake during the early stages of the caldera's development.
 The third phase of activity constructed the classic east-northeast striking 2696 Ma Noranda Caldera which contains a 7-to-9-km-thick succession of mafic and felsic rocks erupted during five major series of activity.

The Blake River Megacaldera Complex is considered a supervolcano due to its great size and its multiple dikes and vents. As a result, the Blake River Group is best categorized as a meganested caldera complex.

See also
List of volcanoes in Canada
Volcanism of Canada
Volcanism of Eastern Canada

References

Calderas of Ontario
Calderas of Quebec
Supervolcanoes
Volcanic groups
Archean calderas
Polygenetic volcanoes
Landforms of Abitibi-Témiscamingue